Mohsen Ebrahimzadeh (born September 8, 1987 in Torbat-e Heydarieh) is an Iranian pop singer and musician. He performed at the 2018 AFC Champions League Final between Persepolis and the Kashima Antlers.

Mohsen Ebrahimzadeh performed his first live concert in September 2015 in Karaj.

Discography

Singles 

 01: Smell of Eid (new version)
 02: Prohibited
 03: I love (With Mustafa Momeni)
 04: Immeasurable
 05: Please
 06: don't say no
 07: disloyal
 08: Loneliness
 09: who knows
 10: turn back
 11: You are a fan
 12: I miss you
 13: Bye
 14: Port
 15: you are right
 16: Slow down
 17: U know
 18: Seventy-two commanders
 19: Sahe Mani
 20: Love on the way
 21: my love (With Ali Abbasi)
 22: you is not
 23:The world is mine
 24: Tab
 25: Out of habit
 24: Complaint
 25: you say
 26: Ashob
 27: Del mo
 28: Arbab Asheghi
 39: Tamom kon bro
 30: Bazam Barf
 31: Cegader Zod
 32: Mage Darim
 33: Gahrman Bi Eda
 34: Boy Baron
 35: Ta Abad
 36: Kare Dele
 37: Dorehami
 38: Sale New
 39: Tavalodet
 40: Emshab
 41: Aziz Ke Bodi
 42: Bardasht Raft
 43: Kojaei
 44: Shab Gardi
 45: Galaf
 46: Pay Sabetam
 47: Sabhay Divongi
 48: Dard Del
 49: In Del Raft
 50: Bahone Poreh
 51: Chi Shod
 52: Timar
 53: Misi Fadas
 54: Marham Jan
 55: Gerdab
 56: ToYAR Mani
 57: Doneh Doneh

References

External links 
 

21st-century Iranian male singers
Iranian singer-songwriters
Persian-language singers
Iranian male singers
Iranian pop singers
Iranian composers
Living people
1987 births